Ewart Douglas Horsfall MC (24 May 1892 – 1 February 1974) was a British rower who competed in the 1912 Summer Olympics and in the 1920 Summer Olympics.

Personal life
Horsfall's first marriage was with Myra Downing Fullerton, daughter of Frederick Downing Fullerton in 1923. They had three children, Robin, Geoffrey and Anne. After his divorce, he married Betty Fairfax Rushby (1906 - 2000) in 1946. After her death she bequeathed money, and collections of art, ceramics, furniture and other objects that she had mostly inherited from her own parents, to the University of Liverpool in his home city of Liverpool.

Business career
He was a member of the wealthy Horsfall family of Liverpool. In his time the family traded in palm oil from Africa.

Sporting career
Horsfall was born in Liverpool, the son of Howard Douglas Horsfall and was educated at Eton College and Magdalen College, Oxford. He arrived at Oxford with an outstanding reputation as a rower and in 1912 was in the winning Oxford boat in the Boat Race. He joined Leander Club and was a member of the Leander eight which won the gold medal for Great Britain rowing at the 1912 Summer Olympics. At the age of 20, he was the youngest member of the crew.

Horsfall stroked Oxford in the Boat Race in 1913 and became the first stroke to win the Boat Race after being behind at Barnes Railway Bridge. However Oxford lost in 1914, when Horsfall rowed at number four. He won the Grand Challenge Cup at Henley Royal Regatta four times – three times as a stroke – and he twice stroked the winning crew in the Stewards' Challenge Cup at Henley on the two occasions when he competed.

After the war, he returned to Oxford to help re-establish rowing at the university. He was strokeman of the Leander eight which won the silver medal for Great Britain rowing at the 1920 Summer Olympics, coming within half a length of winning. In 1947 Horsfall was elected a Steward of Henley Royal Regatta and the following year he was manager of the British Olympic Rowing team.

Military career
At the outbreak of the First World War, Horsfall joined the Rifle Brigade but later transferred to the Royal Flying Corps; He qualified as a pilot on 31 December 1914, and reached the rank of squadron leader. He was in command of 58 Squadron later in the war and briefly in 3 Squadron in late 1917. He was Mentioned in Dispatches and awarded the Military Cross and Chevalier in the Legion d'Honneur in 1916 when he was a temporary second lieutenant and temporary captain. He reached the rank of Major later in 1916 but became unfit for active service at times in 1917 and 1918. He was promoted to Lieutenant-Colonel in 1918.

See also
List of Oxford University Boat Race crews

References

External links
The Scottish War Memorials Project – Photos of Eton Eight

1892 births
1974 deaths
Sportspeople from Liverpool
Alumni of Magdalen College, Oxford
British Army personnel of World War I
English male rowers
British male rowers
Olympic rowers of Great Britain
People educated at Eton College
Rowers at the 1912 Summer Olympics
Rowers at the 1920 Summer Olympics
English Olympic medallists
Olympic gold medallists for Great Britain
Olympic silver medallists for Great Britain
Royal Flying Corps officers
Recipients of the Military Cross
Officiers of the Légion d'honneur
Stewards of Henley Royal Regatta
Olympic medalists in rowing
Members of Leander Club
Oxford University Boat Club rowers
Medalists at the 1912 Summer Olympics
Medalists at the 1920 Summer Olympics